Antonio Piedra Pérez (born 10 October 1985) is a Spanish former professional road bicycle racer, who rode professionally between 2007 and 2017 for the , , ,  and  squads.

Career
Born in Seville, Piedra became a professional in 2007, competing for the  team, before joining  in 2008. He spent four years with the team before joining the  team for the 2012 season. Piedra took a prestigious victory by winning the Rogaland GP in May 2012, soloing away to win by 35 seconds over his nearest challenger. He participated in that year's Vuelta a España, his team being invited as a 'wildcard', and had a major victory on stage 15, a high mountain affair finishing atop the Lakes of Covadonga climb. Piedra followed a move that formed on the first climb of the day, and dropped his breakaway companions on the final difficulty of the race, the first "Hors Category" climb of the Vuelta. He had 2 minutes and 2 seconds of an advantage over his nearest competitor, 's Rubén Pérez.

Major results

2006
 2nd Overall Vuelta a Segovia
1st Stage 3
 3rd Overall Vuelta a Palencia
1st Stage 2 (TTT)
2009
 1st Stage 5 Volta a Portugal
2011
 8th Overall Tour de San Luis
 9th Gran Premio de Llodio
2012
 1st Rogaland GP
 1st Stage 15 Vuelta a España
2013
 Combativity award Stage 5 Vuelta a España
2016
 10th Overall Tour de Langkawi

References

External links
Caja Rural profile

Cycling Quotient profile

Spanish male cyclists
1985 births
Living people
Sportspeople from Seville
Spanish Vuelta a España stage winners
Cyclists from Andalusia